Gymnastics events have been staged at the Olympic Games since 1896. Romanian female gymnasts have participated in every Olympic Games since 1952 except for 1968. A total of 74 female gymnasts have represented Romania. Romanian women have won 62 medals at the Olympics – 12 in team all-around, 11 in individual all-around, 10 in balance beam, 13 in floor exercise, 11 in vault, and 5 in uneven bars. The medals include 24 golds. Romania medaled in the team all-around in every Summer Olympics between 1976 and 2012, winning golds in 1984, 2000, and 2004.

Eight Romanian female gymnasts have won at least four medals at the Olympic Games: Nadia Comăneci (nine), Simona Amânar (seven), Lavinia Miloșovici (six), Daniela Silivaș (six), Gina Gogean (five), Cătălina Ponor (five), Ecaterina Szabo (five), and Sandra Izbașa (four).

Nadia Comăneci, who competed at the 1976 and 1980 Olympics, won nine total Olympic medals, the most of any Romanian female gymnast. She won five medals in 1976, including golds in individual all-around, balance beam, and uneven bars. She also became the first woman to ever score a perfect 10 at the Olympics. In 1980, she won four more medals, including golds in balance beam and floor exercise.

In 1984, Ecaterina Szabo won five medals at the only Olympics she participated in. She won golds in team all-around, balance beam, floor exercise, and vault. In 1988, Daniela Silivaș won six medals at the only Olympics she participated in, earning golds in balance beam, floor exercise, and uneven bars.

Lavinia Miloșovici and Gina Gogean both competed at the 1992 and 1996 Olympics. Miloșovici won four of her six medals in 1992, while Gogean won four of her five medals in 1996. Simona Amânar competed in 1996 and 2000 and earned seven medals, the second-most of any Romanian female gymnast. She won gold in the 1996 vault event and the 2000 team all-around and individual all-around.

In 2004, Cătălina Ponor won gold medals in team all-around, floor exercise, and balance beam. She did not compete at the 2008 Olympic Games but came back in 2012 to win two more medals. Sandra Izbașa won four total medals in 2008 and 2012, including the 2008 floor exercise gold and 2012 vault gold.

Gymnasts

Medalists

References

Romania
Gymnasts
Olympic
Romania